Mylothris bernice is a butterfly in the family Pieridae. It is found from Cameroon and Gabon to the Democratic Republic of the Congo, Rwanda, Burundi, Uganda and Zambia. The habitat consists of marshes and swamps.

The larvae feed on Persicaria attenuata pulchra. Final instar larvae have a dark brown head and a pale brown body with dark brown bands. Pupation takes place in a pale pinkish brown pupa.

Subspecies
M. b. bernice (Cameroon, Gabon)
M. b. albescens Berger, 1981 (Democratic Republic of the Congo)
M. b. berenicides Holland, 1896 (Democratic Republic of the Congo, Rwanda, Burundi, Uganda)
M. b. nigrovenosa Berger, 1981 (Democratic Republic of the Congo)
M. b. overlaeti Berger, 1981 (Democratic Republic of the Congo, Zambia)

References

Seitz, A. Die Gross-Schmetterlinge der Erde 13: Die Afrikanischen Tagfalter. Plate XIII 12

Butterflies described in 1866
Pierini
Butterflies of Africa
Taxa named by William Chapman Hewitson